Didymella arachidicola (syn. Didymosphaeria arachidicola) is a plant pathogen.

References

External links
 Index Fungorum
 USDA ARS Fungal Database

Pleosporales
Fungal plant pathogens and diseases
Fungi described in 1924